Good Day is the debut single by Australian singer, Hayley Warner who was the runner-up in the 2009 season of Australian Idol. The song was written by Andy Stochansky, Greg Critchley and Damhnait Doyle and was available for digital download on 22 November 2009. The single was later released to radios and on physical CD on 11 December 2009 after signing a record contract with Sony Music.

The single debuted at #11 on the ARIA Singles Chart on 20 December 2009.

Chart performance

Track listing
 Australian CD single

 "Good Day" - 3:12

Release history

References

2009 songs
Hayley Warner songs
Songs written by Andy Stochansky